Lovelinus is the first single album by South Korean girl group Lovelyz. It was released on December 7, 2015. The album contains three tracks with the title track "For You".

Background and release
On November 25, 2015, Woollim Entertainment announced Lovelyz would make a surprise return through a teaser image that included the "Lovelinus" album logo. Lovelinus is also the official fandom name of Lovelyz. The music video teaser of title track "For You" was released on December 3, 2015 following by the subsequent release of the full version together with the digital album on December 7, 2015.

Track listing

Release history

References 

Lovelyz albums
2015 albums
Korean-language albums
Single albums